The People's Republic of China competed at the 1994 Winter Olympics in Lillehammer, Norway.

Medalists

Competitors
The following is the list of number of competitors in the Games.

Biathlon

Women

Figure skating

Freestyle skiing

Women

Short track speed skating

Men

Women

Speed skating

Men

Women

References

Official Olympic Reports
International Olympic Committee results database

Nations at the 1994 Winter Olympics
1994
Winter Olympics